State Route 431 (SR 431) is a  secondary state highway in the northwestern part of the U.S. state of Tennessee.

Route description

SR 431 travels southeast to northwest from just southeast of Martin in Weakley County to just east of Union City in Obion County.

SR 431 is known in Martin west of the downtown area as University Avenue. The campus of the University of Tennessee at Martin is located along University Avenue, which divides it into the main campus area and the agriculture campus, where the football stadium, ROTC, and the rodeo pavilion are located. The Martin Walmart and the communities of Gardner and Midway are also located along this highway, as is an access road to Everett-Stewart Regional Airport.

History

SR 431 is the original alignment of SR 22, a primary state highway. It was replaced with the current four-lane divided, access-controlled section which now parallels the former route to the north. The old portion was then designated SR 431.

Major intersections

References

431
Transportation in Weakley County, Tennessee
Transportation in Obion County, Tennessee
Union City, Tennessee micropolitan area